Kunchepalli is a village located at Podili mandal in Prakasam district in the state of Andhra Pradesh in India.

References 

Villages in Prakasam district